Rikord Island (Russian: Остров Рикорда) is an island in Peter the Great Gulf located  to the south of Zolotoy Rog and  to the south of Reyneke Island. It was named after admiral Pyotr Rikord.

Administratively the island is under Vladivostok's jurisdiction.

The highest point is 178 m above sea level. The island is a part of Eugénie de Montijo Archipelago.

Notes

Uninhabited islands of Russia
Islands of the Sea of Japan
Islands of Vladivostok
Peter the Great Gulf